"All 4 One" is the debut album by the German group beFour.

Production

19 producers and songwriters participated in the production of beFour's debut album. Christian Geller and Adam Bernau produced all the pieces on the CD. Bernau mixed almost all titles of the longplayer. The lyrics come, with some exceptions, from Geller. The first single released song Magic Melody was written by Alexey Potekin, Sergei Zhukov and Christian Geller. The text and composition of the song Come Fly with Me are by Nick Manic and Mike Jaxx. The second piece that was decoupled from the album, How Do You Do?, composed Christian Geller, Wolfgang Boss and Dmitry Kokhanovskiy.

The song Zero Gravity was written by Petra Bonmassar, Achim Kleist and Wolfgang von Webenau. Geller and Bernau did not participate in the song Cherry Babe; Music and lyrics are written by Marcel Botezan, Lucian Ionescu, Radu Bolifea and Sebastoam Barac. The penultimate title of the album, Bye Bye Baby, was written in 2007 by Mark Nissen, Hartmut Krech and Antonio Berardi.

Track listing

 "Magic Melody" – 3:37
 "Come Fly With Me" – 3:35
 "Little, Little Love" – 3:09
 "All 4 One" – 3:41
 "Cosmic Ride" – 3:50
 "Zero Gravity" – 2:59
 "A New Generation" – 3:30
 "Everybody" – 4:01
 "Fly Around the World" – 3:46
 "Cherry Babe" – 3:43
 "Red (The Color of Love)" – 3:33
 "Bye Bye Baby" – 3:16
 "Magic Melody"(Karaoke Version) – 3:37

Charts and certifications

Weekly charts

Year-end charts

Certifications

References

2007 debut albums
BeFour albums